Tyler Everingham (born 7 January 2001) is a racing driver from Australia. He currently competes in the Super2 Series for MW Motorsport. In 2019, he was awarded the Mike Kable Young Gun Award.

Career results

Career Summary 

*Season in progress

Super2 Series results
(key) (Race results only)

Supercars Championship results

Complete Bathurst 12 Hour results

Complete Bathurst 1000 results

References

External links
Supercars Official Profile

2001 births
Living people
Australian racing drivers
Supercars Championship drivers
People from Dubbo
Racing drivers from New South Wales
Australian Endurance Championship drivers
Garry Rogers Motorsport drivers
Australian F4 Championship drivers